Yermolenko, also transliterated Ermolenko is a Ukrainian surname. Its Belarusian equivalent is Yarmolenka/Jarmolienka.

People

Yermolenko
 Maksym Yermolenko (born 1998), Ukrainian footballer
 Ruslan Yermolenko (born 1983), Ukrainian footballer
 Sergey Yermolenko (born 1972), Belarusian footballer and coach
 Yury Yermolenko (born 1967), Russian sport shooter

Ermolenko
 Charles Ermolenko (born 1968), American speedway rider
 Natalia Ermolenko-Yuzhina (1881–1937), Ukrainian opera singer
 Sam Ermolenko (born 1960), American speedway rider

Yarmolenka
 Karyna Yarmolenka (born 2000), Belarusian rhythmic gymnast

See also
 
 
 Yarmolenko

Ukrainian-language surnames